TMF-regulated nuclear protein 1 is a nuclear protein that in humans is encoded by the TRNP1 gene. TRNP1 plays a crucial role in cellular proliferation and brain development. Trnp1 is the first protein that has been shown to play a major role in cortical folding. It represents a major stem cell factor, that is involved in crucial processes during brain but also stem cell development. Trnp1 controls gene expression levels and is sufficient to induce gyri and sulci in the developing brain. Local differences of Trnp1 expression levels in  the human brain correlate with cortical folding.

Function 

Trnp1 binds to DNA with high affinity. Its direct molecular function is unknown, it has no known molecular motif and therefore may represent a new class of molecules. 

Trnp1 has a very strong effect on cellular proliferation, Trnp1 dramatically increases the proliferation rate in vitro an in vivo.

In addition to its stem cell function during brain development, there are data suggesting that Trnp1 might play a crucial role in cancer cells - Trnp1 has been described in gene expression analysis in cancer types. the very strong proliferation capacity may be responsible for its oncogenic potential. Specifically, Trnp1 (together with other factors) serves as a biomarker for specific colon cancer subtypes.

References 

Human proteins